Stephen Wrabel (born January 7, 1989), known mononymously as Wrabel, is an American singer, songwriter and musician based in Los Angeles.

Life and career 
Wrabel attended high school at The Kinkaid School in Houston, Texas. After high school, he studied at the Berklee College of Music for a semester until he left Boston to move to LA and focus on songwriting. He got his first big break when he was signed to Pulse Recording as a songwriter.

In 2010, Wrabel recorded the theme song for the NBC game show Minute to Win It, "Get Up", produced by Eve Nelson.

Wrabel was signed to Island Def Jam in 2012 by Island Def Jam Music Group chairman and CEO Barry Weiss and Executive Vice President/Head of A&R Karen Kwak.

In 2014, Dutch DJ Afrojack released a version of Wrabel's song "Ten Feet Tall", resulting in an international hit. The song premiered in the United States during Super Bowl XLVIII in a Bud Light commercial and was viewed by around 100 million viewers. Wrabel later released the original piano-based version of the song on May 19, 2014. BuzzFeed named the Afrojack version of "Ten Feet Tall" one of the "35 Best Pop Songs You May Have Missed This Summer".

On June 24, 2016, Wrabel released his single "11 Blocks", which was heavily supported and promoted by Kesha. He also released both a lyric video and a music video for the song. He released his second single, titled "Bloodstain", on March 10, 2017. A lyric video for the song was released the same day. In May 2017, he released an EP titled We Could Be Beautiful. In July 2017, he released a song titled The Village, the song dedicated to show support for transgender people. The video shows a young trans boy living with his closed-minded family while the lyrics explain the difficulties in being transgender and a part of the LGBT community. The video ends with "#trans_rights_are_human_rights". The song was written in February 2017 after the removal of federal protections for trans students in public schools, and was quickly released after Donald Trump tweeted about banning transgender individuals from the military.

Achievements 
On the April 22, 2019 episode of The Ellen DeGeneres Show, Pink praised Wrabel and his video for "The Village", stating, "The song ‘The Village' will break your heart into many little tiny pieces... he's great."

Billboard named Wrabel their Pride Artist of the Month in August 2019 saying "For the last decade, the 30-year-old singer-songwriter has been working with big names like Kesha and Adam Lambert while slowly building up his solo career. Now, he's ready for his breakthrough."

People magazine called Wrabel One to Watch in October 2019, saying "in 2019 he went from behind-the-scenes player to pop star."

In September 2019, The Huffington Post said Wrabel is "One of pop's unsung talents", adding "Recommendation from an artist of Pink's stature, on a huge platform like The Ellen DeGeneres Show, was an overdue acknowledgment of a prolific, if still overlooked, talent."

Wrabel was named to the OUT100 in 2017 and is a GLAAD Media Award Nominee for Outstanding Music Artist.

Nylon says Wrabel's debut EP Sideways is "stocked with the soulfulness of a Sia or Sam Smith, and a melodic pop DNA that throws back to icons like Paul Simon, the title track twists heartbreak into something, well, beautiful."

BuzzFeed named "I Want You" one of "The Most Criminally Underrated Pop Songs of 2015".

MNDR released a remix of Wrabel's "I Want You" on October 21, 2015, which premiered on Noisey.

His songwriting credits include releases by Pentatonix, Pink, Kesha, Louis The Child, Kygo, Marshmello, Backstreet Boys, and Ruel.

Usage of songs in other media 
In 2016, the song "Sideways" was featured in the season one finale of Quantico during the graduation celebration.
In 2017, the song "We Could Be Beautiful" appeared in the 2017 reboot of Dynasty in the season one episode "Our Turn Now", during the wedding preparation scene. In 2020, this song also makes an appearance in the Hulu series Love, Victor, in the pilot episode "Welcome to Creekwood".
In 2023, the song "on the way down" was featured in season 19 episode 8 of Grey's Anatomy.

Personal life
Wrabel is openly gay. He is invested in promoting LGBTQ+ rights as a member of this community. His song "11 Blocks" is autobiographical describing his feelings about his first love who had moved 11 blocks away from him in California. The music video for his song "Bloodstain", directed by Isaac Rentz, depicts suffering and heartache in a relationship, while the star Wrabel is fighting for his life.

The music video to his 2017 song "The Village", directed by Dano Cerny, depicts a trans teenager struggling with gender dysphoria, using a binder to flatten his chest and dealing with hostile family members, with the lyrics discussing the same topics. The video includes a caption "In nature, a flock will attack any bird that is more colorful than the others because being different is seen as a threat" and ends with a caption "Dedicated to all the colorful birds" and the hashtag "#TransRightsAreHumanRights". In an interview about the song and video with Billboard, he described it as "the most important thing to me that I have ever done and probably will ever do. It's the closest thing to my heart." He wrote the song in February 2017, shortly after Donald Trump removed federal protections for trans students in public education, and asked his management to rush the release of the video after Trump announced a ban on trans military personnel, with the video including a visual reference to Trump's ban.

Discography

Studio albums

Extended plays

Live albums

Singles

As lead artist

As featured artist

Guest appearances

Songwriting credits

Notes

References

External links
 

American male singer-songwriters
American singer-songwriters
American gay musicians
Living people
1989 births
American LGBT singers
American LGBT songwriters
Gay singers
Gay songwriters
21st-century American male singers
21st-century American singers
20th-century American LGBT people
21st-century American LGBT people
American gay writers